Ruhabad (also Romanized as Rūḥābād; also known as Rūd Khar and Rād Khar) is a small village in Roshtkhar Rural District, Central District, Roshtkhar County, Razavi Khorasan Province, Iran. As of the 2006 census, it has a population of 400, in 99 families.

References 

Populated places in Roshtkhar County